John Entwistle (16 August 1784 – 5 April 1837) was a British politician.

Entwistle lived at Foxholes, in Lancashire.  He was the first president of the South Lancashire Conservative Association.  He served as High Sheriff of Lancashire in 1824.

Entwistle stood unsuccessfully for the Tories in Knaresborough at the 1830 UK general election, and then Rochdale at the 1832 UK general election.  He won Rochdale for the new Conservative Party at the 1835 UK general election, serving until his death, in 1837.

References

1784 births
1837 deaths
Conservative Party (UK) MPs for English constituencies
Members of the Parliament of the United Kingdom for Rochdale
UK MPs 1835–1837